Two Lost in a Dirty Night is a 2002 Brazilian film directed by José Joffily. Based on the play of the same name by Plínio Marcos, it tells the story of Tonho (Roberto Bomtempo) and Paco (Débora Falabella).

Plot
Two Lost in a Dirty Night follows two Brazilian illegal immigrants living in New York City, United States. Paco, a tomboy whose real name is Rita, is very aggressive, strange and mysterious. Antônio, nicknamed Tonho, wants to return to Brazil, because he had no success living in America. They live in a kind of loft. They met each other while Paco was acting as a male prostitute, doing a blowjob on a man (Guy Camilleri). Then, he discovers that Paco is a girl and became furious, trying later to rape her. Tonho saves her and invites her to live with him.

Cast
Roberto Bomtempo as Tonho
Débora Falabella as Paco
David Herman as Moe
Guy Camilleri 
Richard Velazquez
Theodoris Castellanos
John Gilleece
Daniel Porto

Production
Talking about the scene in which she appears completely naked with a gun pointed in her direction, Débora Falabella said, "What made it easier in that scene was the fact that I had to feel afraid and fragile. So being naked helped me in that composition. But of course the scene is uncomfortable, I'm not as comfortable naked as if I were dressed."

Awards and nominations
 Festival de Brasília
Candango Trophy of Best Actress to Débora Falabella
Candango Trophy of Best Director to José Joffily
Candango Trophy of Best Screenplay to Paulo Halm

 Grande Prêmio de Cinema Brasileiro
Best Actress to Débora Falabella
Nomination of Best Editing to Eduardo Escorel
Nomination of Best Adapted Screenplay to Paulo Halm

 Gramado Film Festival
Golden Kikito of Best Editing to Eduardo Escorel
Golden Kikito of Best Music to David Tygel
Nomination of Golden Kikito for Best Film

 Prêmio ACIE de Cinema
Best Actress to Débora Falabella

 Recife Cine PE Audiovisual Festival
Calunga Trophy of Best Cinematography to Nonato Esterla

References

External links
Official site (in Portuguese)
IMDB page of the film

2002 films
Brazilian adventure films
Films about illegal immigration to the United States
Brazilian films based on plays
Films set in New York City
Portuguese-language films
2000s English-language films
Foreign films set in the United States